The Hunter 380 is an American sailboat that was designed by the Hunter Design Team as a cruiser and first built in 1999.

The Hunter 380 shares a common hull with the Hunter 386 and the Hunter 376.

Production
The design was built by Hunter Marine in the United States between 1999 and 2001, but it is now out of production.

Design
The Hunter 380 is a recreational keelboat, built predominantly of fiberglass. It has a fractional sloop B&R rig, a fiberglass mainsheet traveler arch, a raked stem, a walk-through reverse transom, an internally mounted spade-type rudder controlled by a wheel and a fixed wing keel or fin keel. It displaces  and carries  of ballast.

The design has a PHRF racing average handicap of 105 with a high of 114 and low of 96.

See also
List of sailing boat types

Related development
Hunter 38
Hunter 376
Hunter 386

Similar sailboats
Alajuela 38
C&C 38
Catalina 38
Catalina 375
Columbia 38
Eagle 38
Farr 38
Landfall 38
Sabre 38
Shannon 38
Yankee 38

References

External links
Official brochure

Keelboats
1990s sailboat type designs
Sailing yachts
Sailboat type designs by Hunter Design Team
Sailboat types built by Hunter Marine